Koun Mom is a district in Ratanakiri Province, north-east Cambodia. In 1998, it had a population of 8,814.

Administration
The district is subdivided into six communes (khum), which are further subdivided into 23 villages (phum).

References

Districts of Ratanakiri province